This is a list of the largest Southeast Asian banks, measured by total assets, market capitalisation, sales, and profit.

Largest Southeast Asian banks by Overall 
By Forbes TheGlobal2000 for 2022

Largest Southeast Asian banks by total assets 
Information from Forbes as of 2022

Largest Southeast Asian banks by market capitalisation 
Information from Forbes as of 2022

Largest Southeast Asian banks by sales 
Information from Forbes as of 2022

Largest Southeast Asian banks by profit 
Information from Forbes as of 2022

See also
 List of largest banks
 List of largest banks in the United States
 List of largest banks in North America
 List of largest banks in Latin America

References

Largest